Reverend Flowers may refer to:

Paul Flowers (banker), former chairman of the Co-operative Bank and a Methodist minister
Reverend Flowers, a fictional character on the 1988 Australian soap opera Home and Away